Ahmed Hosny (born 18 June 1991 in Cairo) is an Egyptian professional squash player. As of February 2018, he was ranked number 91 in the world. He has competed in multiple professional squash tournaments.

References

1991 births
Living people
Egyptian male squash players
21st-century Egyptian people